Mohammadabad (also Romanized as Moḩammadābād; also known as Muhammadābād) is a village in Shohada Rural District, in the Central District of Meybod County, Yazd Province, Iran. At the 2006 census, its population was 214, in 72 families.

References 

Populated places in Meybod County